Joaquin Bordado is a 2008 Philippine television drama action series broadcast by GMA Network. The series is based on a Philippine comic book serial by Carlo J. Caparas with the same title. Directed by Mac Alejandre and Argel Joseph, it stars Robin Padilla in the title role. It premiered on February 11, 2008 on the network's Telebabad line up replacing Zaido: Pulis Pangkalawakan. The series concluded on July 11, 2008 with a total of 108 episodes. It was replaced by Codename: Asero in its timeslot.

A behind the scenes special of the series Ang Mundo ni Joaquin Bordado was aired on February 8, 2008.

Cast and characters

Lead cast
 Robin Padilla as Joaquin Bordado / Joaquin Apacible

Supporting cast
 Iza Calzado as Sofia Apacible / Carol Aguila
 Eddie Garcia as Russo
 Ian Veneracion and Prince Stefan as Jerome Apacible / Miguel Aguila
 Mark Herras as Jason Apacible / Andre
 John Regala as Cefiro
 Antonio Aquitania as Kevin
 Renz Valerio as Jimboy
 Iwa Moto as Diane
 Ryza Cenon as Cecile
 Pen Medina and BJ Forbes as Jilco
 Rommel Padilla as Alfredo
 Maverick Relova as Tom
 Ariel Villasanta as Jerry
 Jun Hidalgo as Hugo
 Kylie Padilla as Erenea

Recurring cast
 Ralph Padilla as Mico
 Gloria Sevilla as Lolit
 John Feir as Johnny
 Gene Padilla as Franco
 July Hidalgo as Preston
 Melissa Avelino as Andeng
 Bea Binene as Liza
 Jake Vargas as Baloy
 Mon Confiado as Warden Gomez
 Maggie Wilson as Brianna
 Gina Alajar as Regina

Guest cast
 Marky Cielo as teen Joaquin
 Raquel Motesa as Daniel's mother
 Timothy Chan as kid Joaquin
 Nonie Buencamino as Mr. Apacible
 Ella V. as Alcera
 Anna Leah Javier as Vexus
 Daiana Menezes as Ivarna
 Jenny Miller as Elixera
 Leila Kuzma as Agoria
 Rez Cortez as Mendoza
 Tyron Perez as Mon
 Zamierre Benevice as Charisse
 Cris Martinez as Jojo
 Ayen Laurel as Minerva
 Shamaine Centenera-Buencamino as Joaquin's mother
 Anton Bernardo as Domeng
 Victor Aliwalas as Nelson
 Joseph Izon as Olsen
 Shiela Marie Rodriguez as Vicky
 Shirley Fuentes as Celeste
 Richard Quan as Ronaldo

Production
Actresses Jennylyn Mercado and Cristine Reyes were initially tapped to play important roles in the series. Due to Mercado's pregnancy, she had to be replaced by Ryza Cenon, while Reyes had some problems with the production and was quickly replaced by Iwa Moto.

Robin Padilla, the lead star, had to endure six hours of body make-up every day for his tattoos.

10 crew members of the show were injured after their L-300 van (TSJ-518) from Subic to Metro Manila crashed along the North Luzon Expressway (NLEX) Valenzuela exit on May 6, 2008. Rushed to the Orthopedic Hospital was Ronaldo Godoy; to the Karuhatan Hospital were Demetrio Macaraig, stuntman Danny Bragais, Abnel Severino, Alfredo Manzanares, Steve Esguerra, and Ronnie Santos; and to the Monte Clara Montefalco Hospital in Meycauayan were Alvin Tercena, Francisco Minarag, and Rogelio Elgacio.

On March 7, 2008, Robin Padilla suffered minor fracture injuries while filming a motorcycle stunt at Subic Bay, Olongapo City.

Ratings
According to AGB Nielsen Philippines' Mega Manila household television ratings, the pilot episode of Joaquin Bordado earned a 36.6% rating. While the final episode scored a 40.8% rating.

Accolades

References

External links
 

2008 Philippine television series debuts
2008 Philippine television series endings
Fantaserye and telefantasya
Filipino-language television shows
GMA Network drama series
Philippine action television series
Television shows based on comics
Television shows set in the Philippines